The University of Bristol Society of Change Ringers (UBSCR) is a change ringing society.
UBSCR is associated with the University of Bristol and is affiliated to Bristol SU. UBSCR was established in 1943 and has rung bells at St Michael on the Mount Without since 1944.
Since 1950 there have been over 700 peals rung for the society.
UBSCR is also affiliated to the Central Council of Church Bell Ringers  and sends two representatives to its AGM.

History
UBSCR was founded in the Autumn Term of 1943 by Monica Richardson. Since then generations of student ringers have come and gone, contributing on the way to the development of the Society and its traditions.

The Society's first practice was held on 6 November 1943 at Long Ashton. In 1944 UBSCR moved to St Michael on the Mount, Without. The Society’s first peal (5040 of Grandsire Triples) was rung on 17 May 1947. Since then UBSCR has grown. Students and former students from the Bristol area are active members.

The society home tower was St Michael on the mount, without from 1944 until 2012 when safety concerns limited the amount of ringing at St Michaels. The home tower is now St Matthews, Kingsdown. Ringing continued, albeit sporadically,  at St Michaels until October 2016 when the church suffered a major fire.

Activities
UBSCR holds and participates in many events throughout the course of each academic year, including the meetings of the Southern Universities Association and the Northern Universities Association, a Summer Tour, Cupid Tour (organised by the current master) and a Christmas Party, as well as a cheese and port evening and pudding party. The Annual Dinner is held on the 4th Saturday of January each year and is celebrated with the ringing of peals.

The University Centenary
In 2009 the University of Bristol celebrated the centenary of being granted its Royal Charter.
In celebration, Great George was rung for two minutes, and the bells of Bristol 'followed' Great George by ringing quarter peals and general change ringing. The UBSCR played a part in the celebrations of this event by ringing Great George and by helping with the other ringing.

Great George  
The hour bell in the Wills Memorial Building is rung, by members and friends of UBSCR to mark events and days of national importance or significance
. Examples of this include Queen Elizabeth II's 90th birthday  
and VE day.

Recent Masters
2022 - Current - Josephine Leggett
2021 - 2022 William Stafford
2020 - 2021 Anna Sherwood
2019 - 2020 Matthew Jerome
2018 - 2019 Eleanor Talbot
2017 - 2018 Julian Howes
2016 - 2017 Jed Roughley
2015 - 2016 Robert Beavis
2014 - 2015 Alex Tatlow
2013 - 2014 Edward Mack
2012 - 2013 Richard Webster
2011 - 2012 Richard Barclay
2010 - 2011 Jack Aylward
2009 - 2010  Edward Marchbank
2008 - 2009  Alan Reading 
2007 - 2008  David Richards
2006 - 2007  Edward Colliss	
2005 - 2006  Katherine Fulcher
2004 - 2005  Gaby Cowcill

See also
University of Bristol
University of Bristol Union

References

External links
 The Central Council of Church Bell Ringers
 Official UBSCR Website
 University of Bristol Website
 University of Bristol Union Website

Bell ringing societies in England
University of Bristol
1943 establishments in England
Organizations established in 1943